Mark Burns (30 March 1936 – 8 May 2007) was an English film and television actor.

Biography

Burns was born in Bromsgrove, Worcestershire and educated at Ampleforth College, North Yorkshire. He originally planned to enter the priesthood, but after a short-service commission with the 15th/19th The King's Royal Hussars (1955–57), in which he served in Malaya and Northern Ireland, he became an actor. His career began in 1960 with the film Tunes of Glory followed by the TV series Lorna Doone (1963) and Rupert of Hentzau (1964). One of his most prominent roles was as the male lead in the cult 1966 mystery film Death Is a Woman. Burns also appeared in The Saint episode "The Scales of Justice", and The Prisoner episode "It's Your Funeral" as Number Two's assistant.

He played William Morris in The Charge of the Light Brigade (1968), Bernie in A Day at the Beach (1970), the pianist Alfred in Death in Venice (1971) and Hans von Bülow in Ludwig (1972). Mark Burns obtained his first big role in House of the Living Dead by Ray Austin in 1974 and won the prize for best actor in 1974 at the Sitges Film Festival. In 1975, together with Lynne Frederick he did A Long Return by Pedro Lazaga. He also appeared in Count Dracula (1977) and The Bitch (1979). His career stagnated in the 1980s and 1990s, his last film being Stardust (2007). He died from lung cancer.

Filmography

References

External links

English male film actors
English male television actors
People from Bromsgrove
1936 births
2007 deaths
Male actors from Worcestershire
People educated at Ampleforth College
15th/19th The King's Royal Hussars officers
Deaths from lung cancer in England
20th-century English male actors
21st-century English male actors
Military personnel from Worcestershire